In mathematics, Schur's property, named after Issai Schur, is the property of normed spaces that is satisfied precisely if weak convergence of sequences entails convergence in norm.

Motivation
Does the sequence converge in perhaps a more desirable manner? A canonical example of this property, and commonly used to illustrate the Schur property, is the  sequence space.

Definition
Suppose that we have a normed space (X, ||·||),  an arbitrary member of X, and  an arbitrary sequence in the space. We say that X has Schur's property if  converging weakly to  implies that . In other words, the weak and strong topologies share the same convergent sequences. Note however that weak and strong topologies are always distinct in infinite-dimensional space.

Examples

The space ℓ1 of sequences whose series is absolutely convergent has the Schur property.

Name
This property was named after the early 20th century mathematician Issai Schur who showed that ℓ1 had the above property in his 1921 paper.

See also
Radon-Riesz property for a similar property of normed spaces
Schur's theorem

Notes

References

Functional analysis